Kahn-e Nuk may refer to:
 Kahn-e Nuk, Khash
 Kahn-e Nuk, Nukabad, Khash County